Tremaine J. Fowlkes (born April 11, 1976) is an American former professional basketball player at the small forward position. Fowlkes was drafted out of Fresno State by the Denver Nuggets with the 54th pick of the 1998 NBA draft, though he did not make an NBA on-court appearance until the 2001–02 season. He has played for the Los Angeles Clippers (two seasons), Detroit Pistons (one season, winning the 2003–04 championship) and Indiana Pacers (one season) of the NBA, averaging 3 points and 2.2 rebounds in 103 career games. He also appeared for the New Orleans Hornets during the 2004 preseason.

Fowlkes was one of three players (the others being Britton Johnsen and Marcus Haislip) signed to prorated one-year contracts in the immediate aftermath of the Pacers–Pistons brawl on November 19, 2004, which devastated the Pacers' already banged-up lineup with the suspensions of their three best players, Ron Artest, Jermaine O'Neal and Stephen Jackson.

References

External links 
NBA.com Profile
College & NBA stats @ basketballreference.com
USBasket.com profile

1976 births
Living people
American expatriate basketball people in the Philippines
American expatriate basketball people in Spain
American expatriate basketball people in Syria
American expatriate basketball people in Venezuela
American men's basketball players
Basketball players from Los Angeles
California Golden Bears men's basketball players
Cincinnati Stuff players
Columbus Riverdragons players
Dakota Wizards players
Denver Nuggets draft picks
Detroit Pistons players
Florida Flame players
Fresno State Bulldogs men's basketball players
Gaiteros del Zulia players
Harlem Globetrotters players
Indiana Pacers players
Los Angeles Clippers players
Parade High School All-Americans (boys' basketball)
Philippine Basketball Association imports
Pop Cola Panthers players
Small forwards